This article lists the results and fixtures for the Thailand women's national football team.

Results and upcoming fixtures

2009

2010

2011

2012

2013

2014

2015

 1 Non FIFA 'A' international match

2016

 1 Non FIFA 'A' international match

2017

2018

2019

2020

2021

2022

2023

References

External links
 Football Association of Thailand 
 Thai Football.com
 Thai football page of Fifa.com
 Thai football Blog

Women's national association football team results
 
R